Stone railway station serves the town of Stone, Staffordshire, England. The station is located on a junction of the Colwich to Manchester spur of the West Coast Main Line, but has platforms only on the branch from Stafford to Stoke-on-Trent.

History
There have been two stations at Stone and both were opened by the North Staffordshire Railway. The first opened on 17 April 1848 and was next to the Newcastle Road bridge. With the opening of the Colwich line on 1 May 1849, the original station was closed and replaced the same day by the current station. The station was renamed Stone Junction in January 1888, but reverted to the original name Stone at some point between 1923 and 1947. The Colwich platforms were closed in 1947 and subsequently removed.

The station building has been redeveloped by Stone Town Council as a community centre.

APTIS ticketing here ceased in 1993, when the station became unstaffed.

Recent developments

In 2004, rail services were withdrawn from the station and were replaced by buses, operated by BakerBus; this was initially whilst upgrade work was carried out on the Stafford and Colwich to Cheadle Hulme lines. However, the former Stafford to Stoke local service, that formerly called here, was never reinstated once the work was completed (the units used on it being redeployed in the West Midlands) and so the rail replacement service continued (the Trent Valley local service between Stafford and Coventry also suffered the same fate).

Virgin CrossCountry were reportedly going to reinstate Stone as a stop from June 2006 on the Birmingham to Manchester service, but this never materialised.

However, in December 2008, Stone station reopened for an hourly train service between Crewe and London Euston, as part of a new revamped West Coast Main Line timetable unveiled by the Department for Transport. This service is operated by London Northwestern Railway, as of December 2017. Passenger usage is now returning to reasonable levels (see figures right).

Services
Trains operated by CrossCountry do not currently call at Stone.

The new West Midlands franchise specification plans will, when implemented in 2018, see the current Euston to Crewe trains replaced by a new Birmingham–Wolverhampton–Stoke–Crewe service that will stop here. This was changed for a new London service via Birmingham, due to opposition against losing a direct link to London.
However the operational difficulties resulting from attempting to operate services across Birmingham subsequently led to these services being split and the service here returning to a Birmingham-Crewe one.

Gallery

See also
Listed buildings in Stone, Staffordshire

References

Further reading

External links

 "No 6 - Stone Railway Station", Neville Malkin's "Grand Tour" of the Potteries, retrieved Feb 2017 - has several old pictures, drawings and historical narrative

 
 
 

Stone, Staffordshire
Railway stations in Staffordshire
DfT Category F2 stations
Former North Staffordshire Railway stations
Railway stations in Great Britain opened in 1848
Railway stations in Great Britain closed in 1849
Railway stations in Great Britain opened in 1849
Railway stations served by West Midlands Trains
Grade II listed railway stations
1849 establishments in England